The women's high jump event at the 2003 All-Africa Games was held on October 12.

Results

References
Results
Results

High